D. compacta may refer to:

Dalea compacta (compact praireclover), a plant of the American South
Dasymallomyia compacta, a crane fly in the genus Dasymallomyia
Desmiphora compacta, a beetle of Brazil and Paraguay
Digitaria compacta, a grass of India and Indochina
Dispar compacta (dispar skipper or barred skipper), a butterfly of Australia
Dudleya compacta (bluff lettuce, powdery liveforever or powdery dudleya), a succulent plant of North America